Militia Headquarters Building was a historic site in Macon, Georgia at 552-564 Mulberry Street. It was added to the National Register of Historic Places on April 11, 1972. The building was also used for the American Office Equipment Company. The building was designed in an Italianate architecture style by Bostick & Kein. It is not known when the building was demolished.

The militia was active during the American Civil War era.

See also
National Register of Historic Places listings in Bibb County, Georgia
Fort Hawkins (Macon, Georgia) Militia headquarters during the War of 1812

References

See also
Historic image of block

Buildings and structures in Macon, Georgia
Military facilities on the National Register of Historic Places in Georgia (U.S. state)
Italianate architecture in Georgia (U.S. state)
National Register of Historic Places in Bibb County, Georgia
American Civil War on the National Register of Historic Places
Demolished buildings and structures in Georgia (U.S. state)